The 1918 Denver Pioneers football team represented the University of Denver as a member of the Rocky Mountain Conference (RMC) during the 1918 college football season. In their fourth and final season under head coach John Fike, the Pioneers compiled a 3–2 record (3–1 against conference opponents), finished in second place in the RMC, and were outscored by a total of 74 to 49.

Schedule

References

Denver
Denver Pioneers football seasons
Denver Pioneers football